Euphorbia uniglans is a species of plant in the family Euphorbiaceae. It is endemic to Ethiopia.

References

Endemic flora of Ethiopia
uniglans
Vulnerable plants
Taxonomy articles created by Polbot